Dulangi Wannithilake also spelled as Dulangi Wannithileka (born 17 October 1994) is a Sri Lankan netball player who also is a basketball player and represents Sri Lankan netball team in international netball tournament.

Early life 
She was born and raised in Kurunegala. Her father Wannithilake is a former volleyball player and her mother is a netball coach. She started playing netball at U12 level for the Holy Family Convent, Kurunegala before grabbing the opportunity to play for Sri Lanka U19 netball team.

Career 
She was selected to the national team after emerging from the youth level and was part of the Sri Lankan U19 team which won the Asian Youth Netball Championship in 2015. She made her senior international debut in 2018.

She was a member of the Sri Lankan contingent which emerged as champions at the 2018 Asian Netball Championships beating Singapore 69-50 in the final, which also marked Sri Lanka's first Asian Netball Championships triumph since 2009. She also represented Sri Lanka at the 2019 Netball World Cup, which was also her first World Cup tournament.

References 

1994 births
Living people
Sri Lankan netball players
People from Kurunegala District
Alumni of Holy Family Convent, Kurunegala
2019 Netball World Cup players